Wilson Vieira dos Santos Júnior better known as Wilson Junior, (born 25 April 1991 in João Pessoa) is a Brazilian footballer who acts as a striker. He plays for Boa Esporte Clube.

Career

Bahia
He joined the professional group of Bahia in 2009. His speed and excellence in the pass and kick drew attention.

He gained prominence in the final stretch of the Serie B of the same year, when the team was in crisis. Then coach Sergio Guedes increased his minutes. His first goal came with the shirt tricolor in defeat for the Duque de Caxias 2 to 1. With no chance of falling or rising, Wilson Junior started for the first time, scoring a goal and giving assistance to another.

In 2010, the Copa São Paulo de Futebol Júnior, he was the highlight of Bahia. In the match against Vitoria da Conquista, in Pituaçu, he made the third goal of the match, one minute after entering.

Coritiba
In December 2010, Wilson Junior hit with Coritiba, on loan, with a contract until the end of 2011.

Career statistics
(Correct )

Sao bento futebol clube Atual Clube

Contract
 Coritiba.

References

External links
 ogol

1991 births
Living people
Brazilian footballers
Esporte Clube Bahia players
Coritiba Foot Ball Club players
Associação Portuguesa de Desportos players
People from João Pessoa, Paraíba
Association football forwards
Sportspeople from Paraíba